The Saint Joseph's Roman Catholic Church is located on the north-eastern side of the citadel of Sighișoara, Mureș County in Romania, near the enclosure wall. Unlike the two other biggest churches of the city which were built by Transylvanian Saxons, this one was built by Hungarians. The monument was built between 1894 and 1896, after the demolition of the Franciscan nuns monastery and was designed by the architect Franz Letz. On the northern side it has a very tall belfry. The current interior is the result of changes occurred after the fire of 1893.

References

Sighișoara